The Simone Handbag Museum in Seoul, South Korea, is a museum dedicated to handbags. 300 bags are on display at the museum, dating from 1550 to the present day.

The museum is divided into two halves, Twentieth Century and Contemporary, and Historic (1500–1900).
The museum opened on 19 July 2012 in Seoul's Gangnam District, in a building resembling a handbag. The collection was established by Kenny Park, founder and CEO of Simone Handbags, and was assembled and curated by Judith Clark, Professor of Fashion and Museology at the London College of Fashion. The collection was assembled at a cost of £1 million. Most of the handbags are European in origin, with some contemporary bags from the United States. Bespoke mannequins at the museum have been designed to draw the visitors' attention to the bags on display. Two of the mannequins were designed by the milliner Stephen Jones.

The museum is housed in a 10-story building called Bagstage. Bagstage also incorporates a shop selling bag materials, workshops where new Korean designers can work rent-free, a section where craftsmen will produce bags and two shops.

See also
ESSE Purse Museum in Little Rock, Arkansas, USA
Museum of Bags and Purses in Amsterdam
Handbag collecting

References
 Judith Clark: Handbags: The Making of a Museum, 2012, Yale University Press,

External links
Official site

Fashion museums in South Korea
2012 establishments in South Korea
Museums established in 2012
Museums in Seoul
Bags (fashion)